The Leeds Inner Ring Road is part-motorway and part-A roads in Leeds, West Yorkshire, England, which forms a ring road around the city centre. It has six different road numbers that are all sections of longer roads. Clockwise, the roads are the A58(M), a motorway section of the A58 road; the A64(M), part of the A64 road; the A61 between York Road and the M621; the M621 between junctions 4 and 2; and the A643 between the M621 and A58.

Route
The motorway section of the ring road forms a semicircle around the north of the city centre. It is classified as a motorway to prohibit certain types of traffic and pedestrians but is not designed to modern motorway standards: it has no hard shoulders and many exits are unsuitable for a true motorway, including a right-side (fast lane) slip road exit. Most of it runs in a concrete-walled cutting, but it goes into a tunnel under the Leeds General Infirmary. The motorway cuts through inner-city neighbourhoods such as Woodhouse, Sheepscar, and Buslingthorpe, forming an important link in the road network by allowing traffic from the A65, A660, A58, A61 and A64 to bypass the city centre.

History
Leeds suffered severe traffic congestion as it was on the main route joining Liverpool, Manchester, Bradford and Hull.  In 1955 it was decided to build a dual carriageway to remove through traffic. In the final stages before construction began the road was redesignated as a motorway in 1963, without any changes to the design.  Construction began with the demolition of 365 homes and 174 other structures.

The motorway was built around the city centre in three stages in the 1960s and 1970s. Stage 1 opened was the route from the exit for the town hall to the A58 exit, stage 2 was the A64(M) section and stage 3 linked the road to the A58.  Stages 4 to 6 featured upgrades to the A61 constructed in the 1990s to non-motorway standards featuring traffic light controlled intersections and non-grade separated junctions. When the motorway finally opened, Leeds used the motto Motorway city of the 70s.

The final stage of the inner ring road (stage 7) began construction in 2006 and opened in late 2008. Featuring a large elevated viaduct, it links the M621 at junction 4 with the previously-constructed traffic light controlled interchange at Cross Green, Leeds is of a similar standard to stages 4–6.

The remainder of the Inner Ring Road is formed by using the M621 between junctions 2 and 4 and the A643 between Elland Road and the Armley Gyratory. It is not currently signposted as a complete route on the ground other than on the motorway section to the north of the city centre.

Motorway section junctions

See also
Leeds Outer Ring Road

References

External links

CBRD
Histories – Leeds Inner Ring Road 
Motorway Database – A58(M)
Motorway Database – A64(M)
Videos – A58(M)
Pathetic Motorways
A58(M)
A64(M)
Leeds Construction Link – The building of the inner ring road in the 1960s
The Motorway Archive – Leeds Inner Ring Road

Transport in Leeds
Motorways in England
Roads in Leeds
Ring roads in the United Kingdom